Listyo Sigit Prabowo (born 5 May 1969) is an Indonesian Police-General, who is currently the Chief of the Indonesian National Police (Kapolri). He was previously the Head of the Criminal Investigation Agency (Bareskrim), and was inaugurated by President Joko Widodo as new National Police Chief on 27 January 2021.

Early life and education
Prabowo was born on 5 May 1969 in Ambon, Maluku. He graduated from the National Police Academy in 1991. He is married to Juliati Sapta Dewi Magdalena (Diana Listyo). The couple have two sons and a daughter. He is also the second Christian head of police in the history of Indonesia.

Career

He began his career as a police officer in the Tangerang Police. He held several posts, such as Chief of Police of Pati (2009), Chief of Police of Sukoharjo (2009), Deputy Chief of Semarang Metropolitan Police (2010), and Deputy Chief of Surakarta Metropolitan Police (2011). In 2014, he was assigned to be President Joko Widodo's adjutant. Then he served as Chief of Banten Regional Police (2016), Chief Division of Profession and Internal Security Division (2018), and Chief of Criminal Investigation Agency (2019).

On 27 January 2021, he was appointed as Chief of National Police. As part of his appointment, he was promoted to a four-star police general. He is the second Indonesian Christian and the first Indonesian Catholic to serve the office. He is also the second-youngest Chief of National Police at the time he took office, the record which was still held by Police General Tito Karnavian, who was  when he took office in July 2016.

General Prabowo is known by his vision of police leadership "Presisi" (prediktif, responsibilitas, tranparansi, berkeadilan. translated as predictive-responsible-transparent-equitable), as he presented to the House of Representatives committee during his fit-and-proper test after being President's sole candidate. This vision however, will still continue what was done by his predecessor General Tito with his then-vision "Promoter" (profesional, modern, terpercaya. translated as professional, modern, trusted).

In the summer of 2022, he presided over the investigation into the murder of Nofriansyah Yosua Hutabarat, overcoming an alleged cover-up by police generals to conceal an alleged premeditated murder by Inspector General Ferdy Sambo, head of internal affairs of the Indonesian National Police.

References

Living people
1969 births
Indonesian police officers
Indonesian Roman Catholics
People from Ambon, Maluku